Andrew W. Gould (born October 18, 1963) is a former justice of the Arizona Supreme Court. He assumed office in 2016 and began his second term on January 4, 2021, having been retained to the Arizona Supreme Court on November 3, 2020, with 68.1% of the vote. On March 12, 2021, Gould announced his retirement from the court, effective April 1, 2021.

Early life and education
Gould attended the University of Montana, where he received a bachelor's degree in political science in 1986. He attended law school at the  Northwestern University School of Law, attaining his Juris Doctor degree in 1990.

Professional career 
After graduating from law school, Gould joined the law firm Snell & Wilmer. After working for four years in private practice, Gould became a prosecutor in Yuma and Maricopa counties. In 1998, Gould worked briefly as a prosecutor in Indiana. Starting in 2001, after being appointed by Governor Jane Dee Hull, Gould would spend a decade as a judge of the Yuma County Superior Court , before being appointed to the Arizona Court of Appeals in October 2011 by Governor Jan Brewer.

After the Arizona Supreme Court was expanded to seven justices, Governor Doug Ducey appointed Gould to one of the vacant seats. Gould was sworn in on December 19, 2016. 

In September 2019, Gould authored a 4–3 decision preventing a small business from being forced to create custom invitations for same-sex weddings.

In 2021, Gould announced his retirement effective April 1. Shortly after his official retirement, Gould announced his run as the Republican candidate for Arizona's Attorney General.

References

External links 
 Biography at Ballotpedia
 Vacancy Application

1963 births
21st-century American judges
Arizona Republicans
Justices of the Arizona Supreme Court
Living people
Northwestern University Pritzker School of Law alumni
Place of birth missing (living people)
University of Montana alumni